Oxford Zoo was a zoo in Kidlington, just north of the city of Oxford in Oxfordshire, England. It was opened in 1931 and closed in 1937.

Animals at the zoo included an American brown bear, a bison, a camel, an elephant, two leopards, three lions, two llamas, two polar bears, and wolves. on closure, many of the animals were moved to Dudley Zoo.

The Thames Valley Police headquarters now occupies the location of the zoo. In 2018, an elephant sculpture was installed at a roundabout at the southern end of Kidlington to commemorate the zoo and an elephant called Rosie who was a major attraction at the zoo, commissioned by Kidlington Parish Council and Cherwell District Council.

See also
 List of former zoos and aquariums

References

External links
 Plans of Oxford Zoo, 1932, Oxford University Images

1931 establishments in England
1937 disestablishments in England
Zoos established in 1931
Zoos disestablished in 1937
Zoos in England
Former zoos
Former buildings and structures in Oxfordshire
Buildings and structures in Oxfordshire
Kidlington